Tuvaphantes is a genus of Russian jumping spiders that was first described by D. V. Logunov in 1993.  it contains two species, endemic to Russia: T. arat and T. insolitus.

References

Salticidae
Salticidae genera
Spiders of Russia